is Toshio Matsumoto's first film. Matsumoto made it in 1955 as an English-language PR film, although "a relatively avant-garde" one. The film score was the first by Toru Takemitsu. It was believed lost for many years; however, a copy has been recently found and digitally restored by the National Film Center of the National Museum of Modern Art, Tokyo. It is believed that a DVD of this film is forthcoming.

References

External links 
 
 An interview with Toshio Matsumoto
 Masters of Cinema

1955 films
Japanese short films
1955 short films
1955 directorial debut films
1950s Japanese films
1950s Japanese-language films